Hylaeaicum eleutheropetalum is a species of flowering plant in the family Bromeliaceae, native to tropical South America (Venezuela, Colombia, Ecuador, Peru, northwestern Brazil). It was first described in 1907.

References

Bromelioideae
Flora of South America
Plants described in 1907